The Utah Department of Alcoholic Beverage Services (UDABS) is a state government agency of the U.S. state of Utah. It has its headquarters in Salt Lake City.

The Department was created by statute in 1935 by the Utah State Legislature, and it was granted the authority to conduct, license and regulate the sale of alcoholic beverages within the state.

Utah is one of 19 U.S. jurisdictions (eighteen alcoholic beverage control states and Maryland's Montgomery County Department of Liquor Control) that maintain a monopoly on alcoholic beverage sales.

According to the Department, "The purpose of control is to make liquor available to those adults who choose to drink responsibly - but not to promote the sale of liquor. By keeping liquor out of the private marketplace, no economic incentives are created to maximize sales, open more liquor stores or sell to underage persons. Instead, all policy incentives to promote moderation and to enforce existing liquor laws is  enhanced."

See also
 Alcohol laws of Utah

References

External links
Utah Department of Alcoholic Beverage Control
Origin and purpose

Government agencies established in 1935
Alcoholic Beverage Control
Alcohol monopolies
State alcohol agencies of the United States